River lily may refer to:
Crinum pedunculatum, native to Australia, New Zealand, and some Pacific Islands
Hesperantha coccinea, native to South Africa and Zimbabwe
 River Lily, a river in England